Valeria Alexandrovna Reshetnikova-Tsatouryan (born 13 July 1987), better known by her stage name Eva Rivas, is a Russian-Armenian singer. She represented Armenia in the Eurovision Song Contest 2010 with the song "Apricot Stone". In 2014, Rivas was a judge on the third season of The Voice of Armenia.

Early life
Rivas was born and raised in Rostov-on-Don to an Armenian mother and a father of Russian and Greek descent. She took the stage name Eva Rivas from her Greek great-grandmother. Growing up in Rostov, she sang in the Armenian "Arevik" ensemble.

Career

Eurovision Song Contest

On 14 February 2010, Rivas won the Armenian National Final and went on to represent Armenia in the Eurovision Song Contest 2010 with the song "Apricot Stone." She was placed sixth in the semi-final and advanced to the final where she performed 21st in the line-up and placed seventh with a total of 141 points.

To promote her song that year, Rivas visited, prior to the contest, some European countries. Rivas plans to continue to travel around Europe, promoting her song and making new ones. She had wished to represent Armenia again in the Eurovision Song Contest 2012; however, ultimately Armenia did not participate that year.

Discography

Singles

References

1987 births
Musicians from Rostov-on-Don
Ethnic Armenian women singers
Eurovision Song Contest entrants of 2010
Eurovision Song Contest entrants for Armenia
Living people
Armenian pop singers
21st-century Armenian women singers
Armenian people of Greek descent
Armenian people of Russian descent